Curtis W. Taylor (born July 25, 1995) is a Canadian professional baseball pitcher in the Chicago Cubs organization.

Career
Taylor played youth baseball for the Coquitlam Reds of the British Columbia Premier Baseball League. He attended the University of British Columbia (UBC), where he played college baseball for the UBC Thunderbirds. The Arizona Diamondbacks selected him in the fourth round, with the 119th overall selection, of the 2016 Major League Baseball draft. Taylor made his professional debut with the Hillsboro Hops and played for the Kane County Cougars in 2017.

On November 30, 2017, the Diamondbacks traded Taylor to the Tampa Bay Rays for Brad Boxberger. The Rays invited Taylor to spring training as a non-roster player in 2019. On September 1, 2019, the Rays sent Taylor to the Toronto Blue Jays as a player to be named later in their earlier trade for Eric Sogard. After the 2021 season, the Washington Nationals selected Taylor in the minor league phase of the Rule 5 draft. In February 2023, Taylor signed a minor league contract with the Chicago Cubs.

Taylor was named to the Canadian national baseball team for the 2023 World Baseball Classic.

See also
Rule 5 draft results

References

External links

Living people
1995 births
People from Port Coquitlam
Canadian baseball players
Baseball pitchers
UBC Thunderbirds baseball players
2023 World Baseball Classic players
Hillsboro Hops players
Kane County Cougars players
Charlotte Stone Crabs players
Montgomery Biscuits players
New Hampshire Fisher Cats players
Buffalo Bisons (minor league) players
Wilmington Blue Rocks players
Harrisburg Senators players
Rochester Red Wings players